Django Wexler is an American fantasy author. He has published the "flintlock fantasy" series The Shadow Campaigns (2013–2018), the young adult Forbidden Library fantasy series, and other works.

Career
Wexler obtained degrees in creative writing and computer science from Carnegie Mellon University in Pittsburgh, and engaged in post-graduate artificial intelligence research at the university. He later worked as a programmer and writer for Microsoft in Seattle before turning to writing fiction full-time.

Work

The Shadow Campaigns
Wexler's principal epic fantasy series, The Shadow Campaigns, is set in a world resembling Europe and North Africa of the Napoleonic era. It mainly follows three soldiers of the kingdom of Vordan – Count Janus bet Vhalnich, a character patterned on Napoleon, Marcus d'Ivoire, a seasoned infantry commander posted to a backwards colony, and Winter Ihernglass, a young woman who disguised herself as a man in order to be able to enlist. As they struggle through Vordan's equivalents of the French Revolution and the attendant wars, they also face a supernatural threat in the form of conspiracies fighting for control of the rare remnants of magic still existing in the world.

Reviewing the series for Tor.com, Stefan Raets described the first novel, The Thousand Names, as a "military fantasy full of spectacular battles" with a large and diverse cast, but criticized Winter's lack of agency. The Shadow Throne was appreciated by Publishers Weekly as an "audacious and subversive sequel" and by Liz Bourke at Tor.com as an "immensely entertaining" novel that unlike other male-written fantasy avoided the grimdark trend and featured a "central, significant, queer relationship between two women", but noted that Wexler relied much on coincidences to advance the plot. She also praised the third novel, The Price of Valour, for surpassing its predecessors as an "explosive, action-packed" epic fantasy novel with complex characterization and, again, a wide variety of female characters.

Bibliography
The Shadow Campaigns series
 The Thousand Names, 2013, Roc, 
 The Shadow Throne, 2014, Roc, 
 The Price of Valor, 2015, Del Rey, 
 The Guns of Empire, 2016, Ace, 
 The Infernal Battalion, 2018, Ace, 
Short fiction:
 "The Penitent Damned", 2013, io9
"The Shadow of Elysium", 2015, InterMix

The Forbidden Library series
 The Forbidden Library
 The Mad Apprentice
 The Palace of Glass
 The Fall of the Readers

John Golden series
 John Golden: Freelance Debugger
 John Golden & the Heroes of Mazaroth

The Wells of Sorcery trilogy
 Ship of Smoke and Steel, January 2019, Tor Teen, 
 City of Stone and Silence, January 2020, Tor Teen, 
Siege of Rage and Ruin, January 2021, Tor Teen, 

Burningblade and Silvereye series
 Ashes of the Sun, July 2020
 Blood of the Chosen, October 2021

Other stories
 The Gathering Storm, June–October 2019, Penguin Random House
 Ikoria: Lair of Behemoths—Sundered Bond, April 2020, Penguin Random House
 Amara Kel’s Rules For TIE Pilot Survival (Probably) (short story in Star Wars: The Empire Strikes Back - From A Certain Point of View), November 2020, Del Rey

References

External links 

American fantasy writers
American male writers
Carnegie Mellon University alumni
Microsoft employees
Place of birth missing (living people)
Year of birth missing (living people)
Living people